A shark is a cartilaginous, usually carnivorous fish.

Shark, Sharks or The Shark may also refer to:

Arts and entertainment

Characters
Shark (comics), the name of several characters in DC Comics 
 Shark, in the TV series 12 oz. Mouse
 Shark, in the TV show WordWorld

Film and television
Sharks (1917 film), a French silent crime film
The Shark (1920 film), a lost American silent film
The Shark (1930 film), a French film
The Sharks (film), a 2019 Uruguayan film
Shark!, a 1969 American action film 
Shark (2000 film), a horror film
Shark (2021 film), an Australian short film
Shark (South Korean TV series), 2013 
Shark (American TV series), 2006–2008
Shark (British TV series), 2015 
Shark: Mind of a Demon, a 2006 TV documentary
”Sharks”, residential entrepreneurs on Shark Tank

Literature
Shark (novel), by Will Self, 2014
The Sharks (novel), by Jens Bjørneboe, 1974
Shark, a short story by Edward Bryant, 1973.

Music

Sharks (band formed 2007), a British punk rock band
Sharks (band formed 1972), a British rock band
The Sharks, an American new wave band
Sharks (album), by UFO, 2002
"Sharks", a song by Test Icicles from the 2005 album For Screening Purposes Only
"Sharks", a song by Red Fang from the 2009 album Red Fang
"Sharks", a song by Imagine Dragons from the 2022 album Mercury – Act 2
 WRXZ, a radio station licensed to Briarcliffe Acres, South Carolina, United States and called The Shark in the 1990s
 WWSK, a radio station licensed to Smithtown, New York, United States and called The Shark since 2012

Other uses in arts and entertainment
The Headington Shark, or just The Shark, a 1986 sculpture in Headington, Oxford, England
SHARKS!, a public art installation in London, England

Businesses, organisations and brand names
Shark (helmet manufacturer), France
Shark Energy, a drink
Showing Animals Respect and Kindness (SHARK), an animal rights organization
Shark, a brand of vacuum cleaner manufactured and marketed by SharkNinja

Military
Blackburn Shark, a British carrier-borne torpedo bomber aircraft
, the name of several Royal Navy ships
, the name of several U.S. Navy ships
The Sharks (Royal Navy), a helicopter display team 1975–1992
PNS Hangor (S131), a 1969 Pakistan Navy submarine nicknamed "The Shark"
Typhoon-class submarine, native name Akula (Russian Акула,'Shark')

People
The Shark (nickname), a list of people
Amy Shark (born 1986), Australian singer-songwriter
Shark (musician), Americana singer-songwriter / Score composer

Places

Shark, Arkansas, U.S.
Shark, Kyrgyzstan, Osh Region
Shark Lake, Goldfields-Esperance region, Western Australia
Shark Peak, Antarctica
Shark Valley, Miami-Dade County, Florida, U.S.

Science and technology
Shark (application), an Apple software development optimization tool
Shark, a release of VP-Info database language
Shark, an IBM Enterprise Storage Server
Soft Hard Real-Time Kernel (S.Ha.R.K. or SHaRK), a component-based real-time kernel architecture
ShapeWriter, formerly Shorthand-Aided Rapid Keyboarding (SHARK), a data input method
SHARK, a block cipher in cryptography
Shark, a World War II Enigma cipher
Shark 3D, software

Sports teams
Aussie Sharks, nickname of Australia's national water polo team
Blue Sharks, nickname of the Hungarian basketball team Hübner Nyíregyháza BS
Sharks (rugby union), a South African rugby union team
Sharks F.C., a Nigerian football team
Cronulla-Sutherland Sharks, an Australian rugby league team
Bucks County Sharks, an American rugby league team
Darlington Mowden Park Sharks, an English women's rugby union club
East Fremantle Football Club, nicknamed the Sharks, an Australian rules football club
Hull F.C., an English rugby league team once known as Hull Sharks
Jacksonville Sharks, an indoor American football team
Jacksonville Sharks (WFL), a former American football team
Los Angeles Sharks, an ice hockey team 1972–1974
Nova Southeastern Sharks, university athletics teams 
Orlando Sharks, an American indoor soccer team
Sale Sharks, an English rugby union team 
San Jose Sharks, an American ice hockey team
Shanghai Sharks, a Chinese basketball team 
Sheffield Sharks, an English basketball team
Worcester Sharks, an American ice hockey team

Transportation
Dudek Shark, a Polish paraglider
Shark.Aero Shark, a Slovak ultra-light aircraft
Fly-Fan Shark, a Slovak light aircraft
Shark 24, a yacht
Shark, an American speedboat used by Circle Line Downtown
Shark, a version of the Rotopress garbage truck

Other uses
 King Shark, a fictional supervillain 
 Sharking, or debagging, pulling down someone's trousers, underwear, or top
 Shark (moth), Cucullia umbratica

See also

Card shark,  a person who uses skill and/or deception to win at card games
Loan shark, a person who offers loans at extremely high interest rates
Paul & Shark, an Italian clothing brand
Pool shark (disambiguation)
SHARC (disambiguation)
Shark fin (disambiguation)
Sharkey (disambiguation)
Sharknado, a 2013 American made-for-television sci-fi disaster film 
Shark! Shark!, a 1982 video game
Sharking (disambiguation)
Sharktopus, a 2010 SyFy original horror/science fiction
Sharq (disambiguation)